Thomas Stanoe    was a Welsh Anglican priest in the late 17th and early 18th centuries.

Stanoe was educated at Trinity College, Oxford and became a Fellow in 1667. He held three livings in the City of London: St Ethelburga, Bishopsgate; Christ Church, Greyfriars and St Leonard, Foster Lane. Stanoe was Chaplain to William and Mary. he was Archdeacon of Carmarthen from 1677 until his death on 27 February 1708.

References

1708 deaths
Alumni of Trinity College, Oxford
Fellows of Trinity College, Oxford
17th-century Welsh Anglican priests
18th-century Welsh Anglican priests
Archdeacons of Carmarthen